Chiho is a feminine Japanese given name. The meaning differs based on the kanji used to write it; it may also be written solely in hiragana. Notable people with this name include:

Chiho Aoshima (青島 千穂, born 1974), Japanese pop artist and member of Takashi Murakami's Kaikai Kiki Collective
Chiho Arai (荒井 千歩, born 1991), Japanese child actress
Chiho Hamada (浜田 千穂, born 1992), Japanese freestyle wrestler
, Japanese idol and singer
Chiho Murata, women's professional shogi player
Chiho Osawa (大澤 ちほ; born 1992), Japanese ice hockey player
Chiho Saito (斉藤 千穂, born 1967), Japanese manga artist, most noted for the manga Revolutionary Girl Utena
Chiho Takao (高尾 千穂, born 1984), Japanese freestyle skier
Chiho Torii (鳥居 千穂, born 1970), Japanese volleyball player
, Japanese screenwriter

References

Japanese feminine given names